INB, N.A., formerly Illinois National Bank, is a locally owned, privately held national bank based in Springfield, Illinois. It operates 13 branches and a remittance processing center in central Illinois, as well as a loan production office in Chesterfield, Missouri.

First generation
The original Illinois National Bank was established in 1886 in Springfield, Illinois. In 1989, the bank was sold to First of America Bank and assumed that name on February 1, 1990. In 1997, First of America was sold to National City Bank, which was in turn sold to PNC Bank in 2008.

Second generation

In 1999, a group of Springfield investors and former employees of the first Illinois National Bank came together to form the second generation INB. The new bank opened on June 21, 1999. Beginning with one branch in downtown Springfield, the bank has grown to 13 branches in Central Illinois. INB acquired a remittance processing center in 2000; it is the largest in Illinois outside the Chicago area. Over the years, INB expanded outside the Springfield area by opening branches in Peoria, Bloomington and Champaign. There is also a loan production office in the St. Louis metropolitan area. In 2019, the bank changed its formal name to INB, National Association – shortened to INB, N.A. or INB for most purposes.

Services

INB offers traditional banking products such as checking and savings accounts, mortgage and other loan services, and certificates of deposit; also retirement products like Individual Retirement Accounts (IRA), remittance processing services, and tax preparation services.

References

Banks based in Illinois
Banks established in 1886
Banks established in 1999
Springfield, Illinois
Banks disestablished in 1990
1886 establishments in Illinois
1990 disestablishments in Illinois
Companies based in Sangamon County, Illinois
1999 establishments in Illinois